Antonio "Tonchi" Luansing Tinio is a Filipino activist and former member of the House of Representatives of the Philippines for ACT Teachers Partylist from the 2010 to 2019 and served as Deputy Minority Leader in the 15th congress. He also served as the national chairperson of the Alliance of Concerned Teachers (ACT) from 2002 to 2012.

Early and personal life 
Before his stint in Congress, Tinio was a University of the Philippines Diliman (UP) professor from 1991 to 2010. He is the son of playwright, movie actor, and director Rolando Tinio and theater actress Ella Luansing.

Political career 
As legislator, he was the principal author of Republic Act 10653, which broadened the tax exemptions for the 13th month pay (mandatory year-end bonus amounting to a month of salary) of both public and private sector employees in the Philippines, and the staunchest legislator-advocate of salary hikes for public school teachers.

References

Living people
Filipino educators
Filipino activists
Party-list members of the House of Representatives of the Philippines
Place of birth missing (living people)
Year of birth missing (living people)
Academic staff of the University of the Philippines
Filipino politicians of Chinese descent